Love Songs is the debut studio album by actress and recording artist Jennifer Love Hewitt, released only in Japan on March 21, 1992.

Background
Jennifer Love Hewitt recorded a cover version of the Blondie song "Heart of Glass" as a single for release only in Japan. However, that song was not included in the final track list for this album. Production of Love Songs began in 1991. The first single released from the album was a cover of the ABBA song "Dancing Queen", on June 21, 1991. The second single, "What's It Gonna Take", was released that November. The third and final single, "Please Save Us the World", was released in 1992. A music video for "Please Save Us the World" was made as part of a United Nations charity effort.

Track listing

Personnel
 Jennifer Love Hewitt – vocals, background vocals
 Rod Antoon – drums, keyboard
 Leon "Ndugu" Chancler – drums
 Brad Cole – keyboard
 Liz Constantine – background vocals
 N'Dea Davenport – background vocals
 Jerry Deaton – drums
 Joel Derouin – violin, concert master
 Bruce Dukov – violin
 Bob Etoll – guitar, drums
 Charles Everett – violin
 Armen Garabedian – violin
 Berj Garabedian – violin
 Seth Gilstrap – baritone saxophone
 Gary Herbig – saxophone
 Suzie Katayama – conductor
 Peter Kent – violin
 Rob Lorentz – violin
 Jim Altman - baritone ukulele
 Christian Rollman – keyboard and background vocals
 Dave Marotta – bass
 Quincy McCrary – background vocals
 Kelly Parkinson – violin
 Starr Parodi – keyboard
 Greg Poree – acoustic guitar
 Sheldon Reynolds – guitar
 Steve Richards – cello
 Wolfgang Schmid – bass
 Daniel Smith – cello
 Jana Sorenson – background vocals
 Ralph Stemmann – synclavier
 Chad Wackerman – drums
 John Wheelock – electric guitar
 Fred White – background vocals
 Ed Willett – cello
 Herschel Wise – viola
 John Yoakum – oboe
 Derek J. Young – background vocals
 Nate White – handpan and didgeridoo

Production
Producers: Rod Antoon, Bob Etoll, Greg Poree, Jeffrey Weber
Engineer: Wolfgang Aichholz, John Baker, Vincent Cirilli, Walter Clissen, Clark Germain, Khaliq Glover, Mike McDonald
Mixing: Walter Clissen, Harry Maslin
Mixing assistant: Matt Pakucko
Sound technician: Ralph Stemmann
Keyboard programming: Rod Antoon, Brad Cole, Jerry Deaton, Bob Etoll
Arrangers: Rod Antoon, Brad Cole, Jerry Deaton, Bob Etoll, Greg Poree, Jeffrey Weber
String arrangements: Suzie Katayama

References

Jennifer Love Hewitt albums
1992 debut albums
Meldac albums